K-496 Borisoglebsk is a Russian advanced Delta III SSBN nuclear submarine.  On 21 June 2005 the vessel served as the launch platform for a missile carrying a payload containing a solar sail experiment, Cosmos 1. The submarine was based in the Russian Northern Fleet. In early December 2008 Borisoglebsk was decommissioned from the fleet and was getting ready to be scrapped.

Sources 
Russian Media Monitoring Agency – Kursk submarine (2000–2003) / WPS Russian Media Monitoring Agency
GlobalSecurity.org – 667BDR DELTA III – Russian and Soviet Nuclear Forces

References 

Delta-class submarines
Ships built in the Soviet Union
1977 ships
Cold War submarines of the Soviet Union